The Howie machine gun carrier was a 1937 light U.S. Army scout and machine-gun vehicle prototype, created to prepare for World War II. 

The Howie (also called the Howie-Wiley and nicknamed the "belly flopper") never entered production. A single prototype was made of this early effort at military motorization, an initiative that contributed to the development of the highly successful World War II jeep.

The vehicle was ordered by General Walter C. Short, then Assistant Commandant of The Infantry School, U.S. Army at Fort Benning, Georgia; and built by Captain Robert G. Howie and Master Sergeant Melvin C. Wiley. It was completed in April 1937. Because the two-man crew lay prone, the vehicle was nicknamed the "belly flopper". The crew consisted of a driver and a gunner operating the .30 caliber machine gun.

The vehicle used a rear-engine, rear-wheel-drive layout, that has been mistaken for rear-engine, front-wheel drive, which would make it exceptionally rare. Howie and Wiley used an American Austin car as a basis for the vehicle, and obtained some needed parts from salvage. A tiller was used for steering.

The vehicle presented a low profile—which could be useful in reconnaissance work and combat—but it lacked four-wheel drive, and the low ground-clearance rendered it unsuitable for rough terrain. The Army invited representatives of automobile manufacturerers to examine the Howie in 1940, but the reception was not favorable and the vehicle was not accepted for production. Barney Roos,  chief engineer of Willys Overland, examined it and later said "That belly flopper looked like nothing any automobile man had ever seen before, a cross between a kid's scooter and a diving board on wheels". 

The Howie is still in existence, at Fort Benning.

References 

Experimental military vehicles
United States Army vehicles
Rear-engined vehicles